Virginia Gilmore (born Sherman Virginia Poole, July 26, 1919 – March 28, 1986) was an American film, stage, and television actress.

Early years 
Virginia Gilmore was born on July 26, 1919, in El Monte, California. Her father was a retired officer of the British Army.

Career 
Gilmore began her stage career in San Francisco at the age of 15, but moved to Los Angeles in 1939 to pursue work in films. When her movie career was not progressing, Gilmore mustered the nerve to approach Samuel Goldwyn at his home. As a result of their meeting, he promised her a screen test. She soon landed some small movie roles. Her better known film appearances both occurred in 1941: Western Union, directed by Fritz Lang, and Swamp Water directed by Jean Renoir.

Later years 
When her movie role options began to dwindle, Gilmore left Los Angeles for New York City and started working on Broadway, where she had appeared in A Successful Calamity in 1934. In 1943, she played in Those Endearing Young Charms and The World's Full of Girls.  In 1944, she played the title role in Dear Ruth, which was directed by Moss Hart. Her other Broadway credits include Truckline Cafe (1946), The Grey-eyed People (1952), and Critics Choice (1960).

Starting in the late 1940s, Gilmore had many television roles. In 1949, she and her husband, Yul Brynner, were featured on We're On, an NBC television series. Between 1966 and 1968, she taught drama at Yale University. In her later years, Gilmore was a leader in Alcoholics Anonymous (AA).

Personal life 
In 1944, she married Yul Brynner. The couple had one son, Yul "Rock" Brynner, before divorcing in 1960.

Death 
On March 28, 1986, Gilmore died from chronic obstructive pulmonary disease (COPD) at her home in Santa Barbara, California, aged 66. Upon her death, she was cremated by the Neptune Society and her ashes scattered at sea.

Filmography

Stage performances 
 Those Endearing Young Charms (1943)
 The World's Full of Girls (1943)
 Dear Ruth (1944)
 Truckline Cafe (with Marlon Brando) (1946)
 The Grey-Eyed People (1952)
 Critic's Choice (with Henry Fonda) (1960)

References

External links 

 
 
 The New York Times – Virginia Gilmore

1919 births
1986 deaths
20th-century American actresses
Actresses from Los Angeles
American film actresses
American stage actresses
American television actresses
Deaths from emphysema
People from El Monte, California